The women's 10000 metres points and elimination event at the 2010 Asian Games was held in Guangzhou Velodrome, Guangzhou on 24 November.

Schedule
All times are China Standard Time (UTC+08:00)

Results

References

Roller Sports Results Book Page 23

External links
Results

Roller sports at the 2010 Asian Games